On 25 August 2009, the Kosovo Albanian Vetëvendosje political group organized protests in Pristina against "the EULEX presence and all its actions in Kosovo including the protocol agreement with Serbia". 28 EULEX vehicles were overthrown and left upside-down, one rioter and three police officers wounded.

References

Sources

Protests in Kosovo
2009 riots
2009 in Kosovo